Sarah Davies (born 19 August 1992) is a British weightlifter, competing in the 64 kg and 69 kg categories internationally and representing England and Great Britain at international competitions. She won the silver medal in the women's 71kg event at the 2021 World Weightlifting Championships held in Tashkent, Uzbekistan.

Beauty pageantry
Before her weightlifting career, Davies was active in beauty pageantry, winning the Miss Leeds title.

Weightlifting career
She has competed at five world championships and five European Senior Championships. She was the first British person to win the European u23 Championships in 2015. She competed in the 2014 and 2018 Commonwealth Games representing England and won the silver medal at the 2018 Games. Davies started weightlifting in September 2011 and made her international debut after just two and a half years of training in the sport.

Davies won silver medals representing England at the 2018 Commonwealth Games (-69 kg)and Great Britain at the 2019 European Weightlifting Championships (-64 kg).

Davies won a silver medal at the 2021 European Weightlifting Championships in Moscow, again representing Great Britain.

In November 2021, Davies became the first British person to win a World silver medal by taking silver in the clean and jerk as well as the total.

On 12 April 2022, Davies was sanctioned by British Weight Lifting after she admitted she had made comments of a racial discriminatory nature against a fellow athlete. As part of the sanction, Davies was deselected from representing Great Britain & England for a period of three months, which included the 2022 European Weightlifting Championships held in Tirana, Albania. BWL also called for Davies to resign from her role as Chair of the International Weightlifting Federation's Athletes' Commission with immediate effect. Davies has since stepped down from her position as chair of the IWF Athletes' Commission.

Davies won Gold medals representing England at the 2022 Commonwealth Games (-71 kg).

Davies is the current holder of 6 British records across 2 different weight classes.

Major results

References

External links

 Profile at britishweightlifting.org

1992 births
Living people
British female weightlifters
Sportspeople from Preston, Lancashire
English female weightlifters
Weightlifters at the 2014 Commonwealth Games
Weightlifters at the 2018 Commonwealth Games
Weightlifters at the 2022 Commonwealth Games
Commonwealth Games medallists in weightlifting
Commonwealth Games gold medallists for England
Commonwealth Games silver medallists for England
Weightlifters at the 2020 Summer Olympics
World Weightlifting Championships medalists
Olympic weightlifters of Great Britain
21st-century British women
Medallists at the 2018 Commonwealth Games
Medallists at the 2022 Commonwealth Games